Straight Outta Humboldt is the third studio album by hip-hop duo Potluck. It was released in 2006 via Suburban Noize Records.

Critical reception
PopMatters wrote that the album is "loaded with gargantuan West Coast O.G. funk, sped-up samples, seriously catchy hooks, and -- yes, of course -- weed." Exclaim! called the songs "a little boring overall," but praised "Revolution" as the album highlight.

Track listing
 Rock The World - 2:32
 Get High - 3:57
 Fire - 3:37
 The Magazine Interview (Skit) - 1:19
 Mary Jane feat. The Luniz - 4:40
 Money Makes The World Go Round - 3:38
 Dank Alumni - 6:10
 My Life - 3:27
 What We Are feat. Tech N9ne - 4:20
 U Ain't That Fine feat. E-40 - 4:02
 Meeting With The Boss (Skit) - 1:10
 Roll Big ft. Kottonmouth Kings - 4:17
 Doing Alright - 4:17
 Welcome To Humboldt - 3:52
 Love Me - 3:56
 Revolution - 4:08
 Phone Calls (Skit) - 1:45
 Marijuana 101 - 4:15
 One Day - 3:14
 Our History - 4:51
 Interlude - 0:57
 Funeral feat. Twiztid - 5:05

References

2006 albums
Potluck (group) albums